= Jeannot Hoffmann =

Luxembourgish footballer

Personal information
- Date of birth: 25 March 1934 (age 92)

International career
Years	Team	Apps	(Gls)
1961–1963	Luxembourg	8	(0)

Jeannot Hoffmann (born 25 March 1934) is a Luxembourgish footballer. He played in eight matches for the Luxembourg national football team from 1961 to 1963.
